The APC internal ribosome entry site (IRES) is an RNA element which is located in the coding sequence of the APC gene. APC is a tumour suppressor gene which is associated with the inherited disease adenomatous polyposis coli (APC). It is thought that IRES-mediated translation of APC is important for an apoptotic cascade.

References

External links 
 

Cis-regulatory RNA elements